= Gujarati Samachar =

Gujarat Samachar is a Gujarati language newspaper published in the Ahmedabad and 6 other places namely Surat, Baroda, Bhavnagar, Rajkot, Mumbai and USA

Gujarat Samachar is the highest circulated Gujarati newspaper with more than 55 lakhs readers and about 10.5 lakhs circulation mainly in Gujarat and Maharashtra.
